Pesok is a rural locality (a village) in Tiginskoye Rural Settlement, Vozhegodsky District, Vologda Oblast, Russia. The population was 6 as of 2002.

Geography 
Pesok is located 2 km northwest of Vozhega (the district's administrative centre) by road. Vozhega is the nearest rural locality.

References 

Rural localities in Vozhegodsky District